Static Airplane Jive is a 1993 EP by Guided by Voices.

Track listing
All songs written by Robert Pollard unless otherwise noted.

Side A
 "Big School" – 2:26
 "Damn Good Mr. Jam" (Randy Campbell / R. Pollard / Tobin Sprout) – 3:35

Side B
 "Rubber Man" (Kevin Fennell / R. Pollard) – 0:34
 "Hey Aardvark" (Mitch Mitchell / Jim Pollard / R. Pollard) – 0:51
 "Glow Boy Butlers" – 1:54
 "Gelatin, Ice Cream, Plum …" – 1:26

References

1993 EPs
Guided by Voices EPs